Jakub Sklenář (born March 20, 1988) is a Czech professional ice hockey forward who currently plays for HC Slavia Praha of the Czech Extraliga.

Sklenář played previously for HC Havlíčkův Brod.

References

External links

1988 births
Living people
HC Slavia Praha players
Czech ice hockey forwards